Sharon Tyler is an American politician from Michigan.

Political career 
Tyler represented Michigan's 78th district in the Michigan House of Representatives from 2009 to 2012.

Tyler served as the municipal clerk in Berrien County.

In August 2020, it was announced that Tyler would lead the state association of county clerks.

References

External links 

 Webpage at the Michigan House of Representatives

Living people
21st-century American politicians
21st-century American women politicians
Republican Party members of the Michigan House of Representatives
Women state legislators in Michigan
Year of birth missing (living people)